Hemidactylus longicephalus is a species of gecko. It is found in Central Africa (Angola, Cameroon, São Tomé and Príncipe, the Democratic Republic of the Congo, and the Central African Republic), Namibia, and possibly Tanzania.

References

Hemidactylus
Reptiles of Angola
Reptiles of Cameroon
Reptiles of the Democratic Republic of the Congo
Reptiles of the Central African Republic
Reptiles of Namibia
Vertebrates of São Tomé and Príncipe
Reptiles described in 1873
Taxa named by José Vicente Barbosa du Bocage